At least two ships have been named Fishburn:

 was built at Whitby. She was the largest of the three storeships of the First Fleet to Australia. She disappears from readily accessible records in 1789, after her return from Botany Bay.
 was launched at Sunderland. She was arrested at Riga in 1800 under the Russian embargo on British shipping. After her release new owners sailed her between London and Honduras; she was lost in February 1803 after sailing from Honduras.

Ship names